Herschel Herbert Martin (July 16, 1906 – June 25, 1975) was an American football player. He played college football for Kansas and in the National Football League (NFL) as a back for the Staten Island Stapletons (1929) and Newark Tornadoes (1930). He appeared in 15 NFL games, five as a starter.

References

1906 births
1975 deaths
Kansas Jayhawks football players
Staten Island Stapletons players
Newark Tornadoes players
Players of American football from Missouri
American football defensive backs
Sportspeople from Springfield, Missouri